Jacob Winebrenner Slagle (August 31, 1903 – January 10, 1981), sometimes known as Jake Slagle, was an American football player.

Athletic career
Slagle grew up in Baltimore, Maryland, and attended the Gilman School before enrolling at Princeton University.  He played college football at the fullback, halfback and quarterback positions for the Princeton Tigers football team from 1924 to 1926 and was known as a triple-threat man who handled passing, kicking and rushing responsibilities for the team, and excelled on defense as well.

Slagle was selected by the United Press as a first-team fullback on the 1925 College Football All-America Team.  He also received second-team All-American honors in 1924 from Walter Camp (at quarterback) and in 1925 from the Associated Press (at fullback), All-America Board (at quarterback), Collier's Weekly (at halfback), and others.

After missing most of the 1926 season due to illness, Slagle left the hospital in November 1926 to lead the Tigers to their third consecutive victory over Harvard.  After that game, Princeton coach Bill Roper praised Slagle's efforts:"Slagle played the most remarkable game today, in many ways, ever seen on a football field.  When you consider that previously he had played only forty minutes of football during the present season and came out of the hospital only a week ago, I think the brilliance of his performance was unbeatable."

Slagle also played soccer and baseball at Princeton and was awarded the Poe Cup in June 1927 as "the star triple threat of the Tiger eleven for the past three years."

Later years
In 1927, after receiving his degree in geology with honors, Slagle was hired as an assistant to Princeton's dean and also served as an assistant football coach.  In June 1928, he returned to Baltimore and was hired as the backfield coach for the football team at his alma mater, the Gilman School.

References

1903 births
1981 deaths
American football fullbacks
American football halfbacks
American football quarterbacks
Association footballers not categorized by position
Princeton Tigers baseball players
Princeton Tigers football coaches
Princeton Tigers football players
Princeton Tigers men's soccer players
High school football coaches in Maryland
Gilman School alumni
Players of American football from Baltimore
Soccer players from Baltimore
Association football players not categorized by nationality